Hanuman Prasad Poddar (1892–1971) was an Indian independence activist, littérateur, magazine editor and philanthropist. He was the founding editor of the spiritual magazine, Kalyan which was published by Gita Press setup by Ghanshyam Jalan and Jay Dayal ji Goeyendka. His work in fostering pride among the people regarding India's history and philosophic tradition earned him praise from Mahatma Gandhi. He was affectionally called "Bhai Ji" or "Lovingly Brother". The Government of India issued a postage stamp in his memory in 1992.

Early life
Hanuman Prasad Poddar was born in Ratangarh Rajasthan India. He spent a considerable time in Ratangarh in the Shekhawati region of Rajasthan into a Marwadi Agrawal trading family. Born into a prosperous family of traditional outlook and culture, he received a traditional education and imbibed the culture, traditions and outlook of old India. His father was particularly keen that he should learn English, because the family had begun trading in Kolkata and knowledge of English was a necessary skill for making a success there.

Youth
While he was still a teenager, Poddar was married to a girl from his own community and background, chosen by his parents. Around the same time, he began attending his father's office as an apprentice. He had the opportunity to travel over most of northern India by rail and bullock cart to advance his family's trading business. Once he had gained requisite experience and showed some ability, his father put him in charge of the Kolkata office, as had been the plan for him from an early age. Poddar, who was now in his twenties, made a success of this assignment and the family trading business flourished. Kolkata in those days was still the first city of the British Raj and the place where new ideas and awareness first made their appearance. At this time, four factors came together to produce a major impact on Poddar's mind and personality. These were: his exposure to wider India; exposure to cosmopolitan Kolkata, which in those days drew people from all over India; exposure to the British, whose authority and arrogance was nowhere as evident as in that metropolis; and the pride and knowledge of Indian culture which had come to him from his traditional background. These four factors united to bring about within him an awareness of the pitiful state of India, and the need to instill pride in Indians of their culture and value system.

During these years, his wife remained with his parents in Ratangarh, while Poddar lived in Kolkata in a community hostel with other young Marwadi men who were also working in trade. This arrangement was standard and typical of the Kolkata Marwadi ethos of that day. It was in this milieu that Poddar came into contact with some young Bengali revolutionaries. In those days, Bengal was the cradle of armed struggle against British rule, and Kolkata was still the first city of India. the hostel in which Poddar lived began to be used as a safe house by certain revolutionary youth. When the police raided the hostel, he and every other young man living there was tarred with the same brush as the revolutionaries. Although he was not accused in court of having committed any violent act, the British authorities jailed him for several months, pending trial, merely for having been in contact with the nationalist revolutionaries. This term in jail proved to be a turning point in Poddar's life. Although his family's business was flourishing, Poddar lost interest in pursuing trade. Instead, his inclination turned towards nationalism.

In 1918 he shifted to Bombay now Mumbai to initially work in share brokerage business with his cousin Srinivas Das Poddar owner of the Tarachand Ghanshyamdas firm a leading trading firm of India at the time however over the period of time he developed very close relationship with Lokmanya Tilak, Mahatma Gandhi, Madan Mohan Malviya and other leaders involved in the independent movement. There was a severe flood in Gorakhpur in 1936. Thousands of homes were destroyed by this flood. When Pandit Jawaharlal Nehru learned of this, he visited Gorakhpur.

Publishing career
After being released from the jail he started publishing and editing ‘Kalyaan’ to reach the spiritual glory and heroic deeds of heroes of the Ramayana and the Mahabharata to each Indian to feel them spiritually free and proud of their achievements in the past as a source of inspiration to fight for the independence of India.

He dedicated his life to make available great epics like the Ramayana, the Mahabharata, the Puranas and the Upanishads translated in Hindi to the common people at affordable prices.

He started publishing and editing ‘Kalyaan’ monthly Magazine from 1927 in Hindi with a view to "the betterment of life and the well- being of all". 'Kalyan' has published special issues on all Puranas, Upanishads and on many more subjects related to Hindu culture and religion.

Lovingly called Bhaijee, he was a multifaceted personality. As an editor of the religious magazine 'Kalyan', he is known for his untiring efforts to propagate and disseminate Hinduism across the world.

He wrote many books on spiritual and value–oriented subjects in Hindi and English. In his translation of some Upanishads and Puranas, he has taken care of the communicability of the language to the common people without causing any compromise with their poetic and philosophical heights and depths.

References

External links 
A page from indianpost.com

Rajasthani people
1892 births
1971 deaths
Indian editors
Indian Hindus
People from Churu district
Indian male journalists
Journalists from Rajasthan
20th-century Indian journalists
People associated with Shillong